Punta Scais is a mountain of Lombardy, Italy. It is located in the Bergamo Alps.

References

Mountains of the Alps
Mountains of Lombardy